Greatest is a greatest hits album by English new wave/synth-pop band Duran Duran, released in 1998.

Background and release
Greatest is an update of the 1989 tenth anniversary compilation album, Decade. The new release includes songs from their eponymous debut album through 1997's Medazzaland (excluding 1995's Thank You). The album includes all 14 songs featured in Decade, plus "New Moon on Monday" and four singles from the '90s. However, several songs on the disc are presented in their edited forms in order to fit on a single CD. In addition, the disc oddly uses an edit of "Rio" that was not actually used on any of the song's US single releases, and to this day, has not appeared on any release other than Greatest or The Essential Collection.

The album was released by EMI after parting ways with the band following the disastrous Medazzaland album release in 1997, marking the first of many releases designed to capitalize on the band's extensive EMI-controlled back catalogue. To coincide with the release of the Greatest album in the United Kingdom, the song "Electric Barbarella" was released as a single in that territory. This track was originally released as a single in North America in 1997 to promote the Medazzaland album (which was never released officially in Europe until 2022).

By 2008, the collection had sold 1.3 million copies in the United States, and was certified Platinum by the RIAA. The collection is the band's most commercially successful release overall, but to date, a full collection of Duran Duran's singles on one album still has not been released.

Track listing

VHS edition
The album release was followed in 1999 by the release of a videotape compilation of the band's groundbreaking music videos, also entitled Greatest. It was not released on DVD at the time. The video album was certified platinum by the RIAA on 29 January 2004.

Video album track listing
 "Planet Earth"
 "Girls on Film" (Uncensored)
 "The Chauffeur" (Uncensored)
 "Hungry Like the Wolf"
 "Save a Prayer"
 "Rio"
 "Is There Something I Should Know?"
 "Union of the Snake"
 "New Moon on Monday"
 "The Reflex"
 "The Wild Boys" (extended version)
 "A View to a Kill"
 "Notorious"
 "Skin Trade"
 "I Don't Want Your Love"
 "All She Wants Is"
 "Serious"
 "Burning the Ground"
 "Ordinary World"
 "Come Undone"
 "Electric Barbarella"
 "My Own Way"
 The Wedding Album EPK

DVD edition

In November 2003, the videotape compilation was released in DVD format, titled Duran Duran: Greatest – The DVD, with hidden extra materials, including alternative versions of some of the videos and interviews of the band; however, this version is much criticised for its extensive use of easter egg features, which make it difficult to find and play some materials. In 2005, the disc was re-issued in a "Sight & Sound" package, containing both the CD and the DVD minus all of the latter's bonus material.

DVD Easter eggs

DVD one
A) Girls on Film (6:26 – long, uncensored version with an alternative ending)
 Plays alternately after watching the long uncensored version.

B) Union of the Snake (4:19 – Dancing on the Valentine version)

C) New Moon on Monday (5 alternate versions):
Dancing on the Valentine version, with moon shots – 5:30
Alternate version 1, with intro dialogue; not the same one shown on MTV (that version has never been released commercially) – 5:00
Alternate version 2 – 5:01
Short version, without intro – 3:43
Movie version, with extended dialogue, uses unique extended version of song, not the 12" remix – 17:37

D) The Wild Boys (7:43 – Long Arena Version):
 Plays alternately after watching the 7" Edit Version

La Galerie De Duran

a) Planet Earth (4:05 – Club Version)

b) A Day in the Life featurette 2:26

c) Girls on Film (3:24 – Censored/MTV version)

d) Midsummer Night's Tube Feature (4:31 – Nick and Simon discuss the recording and production of the album Seven and the Ragged Tiger)

e) Wild Boys Interview (8:53 – Paul Gambaccini talks to Roger, Andy and Simon)

f) View to a Kill Interview (1:52 – Paul Gambaccini talks with John and Andy)

DVD two
a) Liberty album Electronic Press Kit (EPK)

b) Serious (Multi-angle version)

c) The Wedding Album Television Commercial

d) Come Undone (Censored/MTV version)

Full hidden track listing

DVD one
 01 "Planet Earth" (3:59). Note Title 01 has 12 chapters and plays the 12 main menu clips in sequence. The duplicates at Titles 02 and 24 play this clip by itself.
 03 "Girls on Film" (6:25). Uncensored "night version".
 04 "Girls on Film" (6:25). Uncensored "night version" with alternative ending from 5:54, where the band members hold up a banner which reads "Some people will do anything to sell records".
 05 "The Chauffeur" (5:00)
 06 "Hungry Like the Wolf" (3:41). Duplicate at Title 27.
 07 "Save a Prayer" (6:05). Note Title 07 has 12 chapters and cycles through the 12 main menu clips, starting from this one. The duplicates at Titles 08 and 28 play this clip by itself.
 09 "Rio" (5:03). Duplicate at Title 26.
 10 "Is There Something I Should Know?" (4:35). Duplicate at Title 30.
 11 "Union of the Snake" (4:20). Standard version. Duplicate at Title 33.
 12 "Union of the Snake" (4:20). Dancing on the Valentine EP version.
 13 "New Moon on Monday" (5:30). Dancing on the Valentine EP version with long intro. Note Title 13 has 12 chapters and cycles through the 12 main menu clips, starting from this one. Duplicate at Title 14 plays this clip by itself.
 15 "New Moon on Monday" (5:01). Alternative version 1 with shortened intro.
 16 "New Moon on Monday" (5:01). Alternative version 2 with shortened intro. The only differences between this version and the previous one are some animated "sparkles" at 2:54, 3:13 and 3:21. Duplicate at Title 32.
 17 "New Moon on Monday" (3:49). Alternative version 3 with no intro, short version. None of these versions are the ones shown on MTV, VH1, or any other video show in the '80s, '90s, or today. That version, with or without the intro, features a very specific and unique edit of footage and has never been released commercially.
 18 "New Moon on Monday" (17:42). 17-minute movie version set to a unique extended version of the song very different from the 12" remix.
 19 "The Reflex" (4:30).  Duplicate at Title 31.
 20 "The Wild Boys" (4:15). Standard (7") version. Duplicate at Title 34.
 21 "A View to a Kill" (4:07). Duplicate at Title 35.
 22 "The Wild Boys" (7:43). Long Arena version
 23 "Girls on Film" (3:29). Short or MTV "day version"
 25 "Planet Earth" (4:05). Rum Runner club version.
 29 "A Day in the Life" featurette (2:27)
 36 Interview with John and Andy Taylor about "A View to a Kill" (1:52)
 37 Interview with Nick Rhodes and Simon Le Bon about Seven and the Ragged Tiger (4:31)
 38 Interview Simon Le Bon and Roger Taylor about "Wild Boys" (8:54)

DVD two
 01 "Notorious" (3:58). Note Title 01 has 9 chapters and plays the 9 main menu clips in sequence. The duplicates at Titles 02 and 13 play this clip by itself.
 03 "Skin Trade" (4:23). Duplicate at Title 14.
 04 "I Don't Want Your Love" (3:57). Duplicate at Title 15.
 05 "All She Wants Is" (4:28). Note Title 05 has 9 chapters and cycles through the 9 main menu clips, starting from this one. The duplicates at Titles 06 and 16 play this clip by itself.
 07 "Serious" (4:00). Version 1. Duplicate at Title 19.
 08 "Burning the Ground" (3:59). Duplicate at Title 17.
 09 "Ordinary World" (4:40). Note Title 09 has 9 chapters and cycles through the 9 main menu clips, starting from this one. The duplicates at Titles 10 and 21 play this clip by itself.
 11 "Come Undone" (4:21). Uncensored version. Duplicate at Title 22.
 12 "Electric Barbarella" (4:51). Duplicate at Title 25.
 18 Electronic Press Kit for the album Liberty (15:25). It includes the "Violence of Summer" video in two pieces, about 10 seconds is missing.
 20 "Serious" (3:58). Multi-angle version, showing three subtly different versions of the clip simultaneously – one in a large frame and two smaller ones. By selecting the angle, the different versions are shown in the main frame.
 23 "Come Undone" (4:21). Censored/MTV version. You have to look really hard to spot the differences with the uncensored one.
 24 Television commercial for The Wedding Album (0:21).

Personnel

Duran Duran 
Simon Le Bon – lead vocals
 Nick Rhodes – keyboards
 John Taylor – bass (tracks 1-15, 17, 18)
 Andy Taylor – guitars (tracks 1-3, 5-12)
 Roger Taylor – drums (tracks 1-3, 5-12)
 Warren Cuccurullo – guitars (tracks 4, 13-19), bass (16)
 Sterling Campbell – drums (tracks 15, 17)

Production 

 Nigel Reeve – mastering, co-ordination, compilation
 Terry Burch – mastering
 Malcolm Garrett – package design

Charts

Weekly charts

Year-end charts

Certifications

References

1998 greatest hits albums
Duran Duran video albums
Duran Duran compilation albums
2003 video albums
Music video compilation albums
2003 greatest hits albums